Antonio Rastrelli may refer to:

 Antonio Rastrelli (politician) (born 1927), Italian politician and lawyer
 Antonio Rastrelli (swimmer) (born 1945), Italian Olympic swimmer